Xavier School, Manvi, is a private Catholic primary and secondary school located in Manvi, in the north of the state of Karnataka, India. Founded by the Jesuits on 17 June 2007, the Christian minority school has 37 classrooms and hostels.

The school is affiliated with the Indian Central Board of Secondary Education (CBSE) and receives financial support from the North Karnataka Jesuit Education & Charitable Society.

See also

 List of Jesuit schools
 List of schools in Karnataka
 Violence against Christians in India

References  

Jesuit secondary schools in India
Jesuit primary schools in India
Boys' schools in India
Christian schools in Karnataka
Private schools in Karnataka
High schools and secondary schools in Karnataka
Schools in Raichur district
Educational institutions established in 2007
2007 establishments in Karnataka